Esperanza Laboriel López also known as Ela or Ella Laboriel (born March 28, 1949 in Mexico City) is an Afro-Mexican singer and film and television actress of Garifuna origin. As a singer she stood out in the interpretation of genres like jazz and blues; as an actress she had a long career as telenovela player.

Bio 
Ella Laboriel is a member of the artistic Laboriel family, made up of her father Juan José Laboriel, her mother Francisca López, her brothers Johnny, Abraham, and Francis, and her nephew Abe Laboriel. As a child she participated in different programs such as Tío Polito and Los Niños Catedráticos.

Laboriel adopted her stage name in tribute to Ella Fitzgerald. Her career began in 1960 with the so-called Golden Age of rock and roll in Mexico (Época de oro del rock and roll in Mexico) with difficulties associated with the prevailing machismo at the time, starting with her own father, who tried to stop Laboriel's career by like that of her brother Johnny. She was a member of the Trío Las Yolis, a group that became famous as part of the female duos and trios that sang and danced like the Hermanas Jiménez. She began a successful solo career performing genres as rock and roll, a go-go and ballads. She also released duet records with her brother Johnny Laboriel.

She participated in the organization of the Avándaro Festival in 1971, being in charge of the festival's press, a fact that caused conflicts with her brother Johnny. In addition to her musical and actress career, Ella Laboriel is a manager and organizer of musical shows.

Reference 

Actresses from Mexico City
Singers from Mexico City
1949 births
Living people